Swach Vidyalaya is an initiative of Ministry of Human Resource Development, Government of India to create a functional toilet in every school by 15 August 2015. Public sector units under 25 Ministries have pledged Rs. 400 crore for the campaign and private and public sector companies would be encouraged to build toilet blocks in schools. In visakha
valley school health and physical education will conduct a cleaning program in the school. On 7-3-2019.

References 

Ministry of Education (India)
Sanitation
Education in India